After Dark is a 1915 British silent crime film directed by Warwick Buckland and starring Flora Morris, Harry Royston and Harry Gilbey. It is an adaptation of the 1868 play of the same name by Dion Boucicault.

Plot
A baronet's son marries a barmaid in order to qualify under the inheritance terms of a will.

Cast
 Flora Morris as Eliza Medhurst 
 Harry Royston as Charles Dalton  
 Harry Gilbey as Gordon Chumley  
 Beatrice Read as Rose Egerton  
 B.C. Robinson as Chandos Bellingham

References

Bibliography
 Goble, Alan. The Complete Index to Literary Sources in Film. Walter de Gruyter, 1999.

External links

1915 films
1915 crime films
British crime films
British silent short films
1910s English-language films
Films directed by Warwick Buckland
British films based on plays
Films set in England
British black-and-white films
1910s British films